Saks can refer to:
Saks (surname)
Saks, Alabama, a community in the United States
Saks, Inc., holding company of Saks Fifth Avenue
Saks Fifth Avenue, U.S. luxury department store

See also

Sachs
Sachse (disambiguation)
Sacks (surname)
Saksida
Sax (disambiguation)
Saxe (disambiguation)
Small-angle X-ray scattering (SAXS)
Zaks (disambiguation)
Zax (disambiguation)